One hundred and ninety-one Guggenheim Fellowships were awarded in 1953.

1953 U.S. and Canadian fellows

1953 Latin American and Caribbean Fellows

See also
 Guggenheim Fellowship
 List of Guggenheim Fellowships awarded in 1952
 List of Guggenheim Fellowships awarded in 1954

References

1953
1953 awards